The following is a partial list of humanities journals, for academic study and research in the humanities There are thousands of humanities journals in publication, and many more have been published at various points in the past. The list given here is far from exhaustive, and contains only the most influential, currently publishing journals in each field. As a rule of thumb, each field should be represented by about 5 examples, chosen for their current academic importance.

Note: there are many important academic magazines that are not true peer-reviewed journals. They are not listed here.

Archaeology
 American Journal of Archaeology
 Australian Archaeology
 Babesch - Bulletin Antieke Beschaving
 Revue d'Égyptologie
 World Archaeology

Art history
 Bijutsu Kenkyū
 Gentse Bijdragen tot de Interieurgeschiedenis

Development studies
 Journal of International Development

Linguistics
 Bulletin de la Société de Linguistique de Paris
 Cahiers de l'Institut de Linguistique de Louvain
 L'Information Grammaticale
 ITL – International Journal of Applied Linguistics

Literature
American Literary History
 Angelaki
 Diacritics
 Extrapolation
 Foundation – The International Review of Science Fiction
 Modern Fiction Studies
 Multi-Ethnic Literature of the United States
 Science-Fiction Studies

Oriental studies
 Persica
 Revue des Études Arméniennes
 Jerusalem Studies in Arabic and Islam

Medical humanities
 Research and Humanities in Medical Education
 Medical Humanities

Music
 Early Music
 Gamut: The Journal of the Music Theory Society of the Mid-Atlantic
 Indiana Theory Review
 Journal of Music Theory
 Music Analysis
 Music Theory Spectrum
 Perspectives of New Music
 Theory and Practice

Philosophy and ethics
 Angelaki
 Business and Professional Ethics Journal
 Business Ethics Quarterly
 Contemporary Pragmatism
 Philosophy, Psychiatry, & Psychology
 Revue Philosophique de Louvain
 Teaching Philosophy

Semiotics
 The American Journal of Semiotics
 Semiotica
 Sign Systems Studies

Theology and religious studies
Cultic Studies Review
 Ephemerides Theologicae Lovanienses
Hebraic Political Studies
 Nova Religio
 Religion

Jewish studies 

 Revue des Études Juives
 The Jewish Quarterly Review
 Zion (journal)
 Tarbiz
 AJS Review

General
Topic: The Washington & Jefferson College Review

Multidisciplinary humanities journals
 Angelaki
Arkansas Review: A Journal of Delta Studies
 Arts and Humanities in Higher Education
 Community College Humanities Review
 Daedalus
 Diacritics
 Digital Humanities Quarterly
 Ecumenica
 The European Legacy
 Fennia
 The German Quarterly
 Humanitas
 Huntington Library Quarterly
 Interdisciplinary Humanities
 Journal of Controversial Ideas
 Journal of the Royal Asiatic Society
 Katharsis
 Law, Culture and the Humanities
Leonardo 
Leonardo Music Journal
Logeion. A Journal of Ancient Theatre
 Literary and Linguistic Computing
 Medical Humanities
 Modernism/modernity
 Oral Tradition
 Proceedings of the British Academy
 Quarterly Journal of Speech
 Representations
 Studies in Iconography
 Topic: The Washington & Jefferson College Review
 University of Toronto Quarterly
 Utopian Studies
 Victorian Studies
 Yale Journal of Criticism
 Zambezia

Digital humanities
Digital Humanities Quarterly
Digital Medievalist
Digital Scholarship in the Humanities
Southern Spaces

See also
 List of history journals

Lists of academic journals